The 1910 Great Flood of Paris was a catastrophe in which the Seine River, carrying winter rains from its tributaries, flooded the Paris conurbation, France. The Seine water level rose eight metres above the ordinary level.

Chronology 

In the winter of 1909–1910, Paris and the surrounding area experienced higher than normal rainfall which saturated the ground and filled rivers to overflowing.  In January 1910, Parisians were preoccupied with daily life and lulled into a false sense of security because the Seine's waters level had risen and fallen again in December.  Consequently, they largely ignored reports of mudslides and flooding occurring upriver.  They were also slow to notice warnings signs within the city as the Seine's water level rose eight meters higher than normal, its water began to flow much faster than normal, and large amounts of debris appeared. By late January, the Seine River flooded Paris when water pushed upwards from overflowing sewers and subway tunnels, then seeped into basements through fully saturated soil and from the sewer system that got backed up, which led to the basements of several buildings sustaining damage. The waters did not overflow the river's banks within the city, but flooded Paris through tunnels, sewers, and drains. These larger sewer tunnels were engineered by Baron Haussmann and Eugene Belgrand in 1878 which magnified the destruction caused by the flood in 1910. In neighbouring towns both east and west of the capital, the river rose above its banks and flooded the surrounding terrain directly.

Winter floods were a normal occurrence in Paris but, on 21 January, the river began to rise more rapidly than normal. This was seen as a sort of spectacle where people were actually standing in the streets watching the water rise in the Seine. Over the course of the following week, thousands of Parisians evacuated their homes as water infiltrated buildings and streets throughout the city, shutting down much basic infrastructure. The infrastructure was more vulnerable to flooding because most of it was built within the sewage system in order to avoid cluttering the streets.

Police, firefighters, and soldiers moved through waterlogged streets in boats to rescue stranded residents from second-story windows and to distribute aid. Refugees gathered in makeshift shelters in churches, schools, and government buildings. Although the water threatened to overflow the tops of the quay walls lining the river, workmen were able to keep the Seine back with hastily built levees.

Once water invaded the Gare d'Orsay rail terminal, its tracks soon sat under more than a metre of water. To continue moving throughout the city, residents traveled by boat or across a series of wooden walkways built by government engineers and civilians.

On 28 January the water reached its maximum height at 8.62 metres (28.28 feet) above its normal level. In March, the Seine finally returned to normal levels.

Consequences 
Estimates of the flood damage reached some 400 million francs, or $1.5 billion in today's money. The flooding lasted nearly a week, according to one report. Remarkably, despite the damage and duration of the flood, no deaths were reported.

There were fears that an outbreak of disease would occur after debris from flooded homes piled into the streets.

Literature and Media 
 The Knowledge of Water by Sarah Smith, Ballantine, New York (1996) 
 The flood provided the setting for the 2011 animated film A Monster in Paris.

Image gallery

References

Sources
Jeffrey H. Jackson, Paris Under Water: How the City of Light Survived the Great Flood of 1910 (NY: Palgrave Macmillan, 2010)

External links

Crue de la Seine 
Postcard collection of flood photographs
Images by photographer Pierre Petit
Assemblée nationale website on the 1910 flood 
The flood's impact on Parisian hospitals  
L'explosition virtuelle Paris Inondé 1910: Galerie des bibliothèques, Ville de Paris
 Revisiting the flood 100 years later

Great Flood Of Paris, 1910
Great Flood Of Paris, 1910
Great Flood Of Paris, 1910
Floods in France
River Seine
January 1910 events
1910 disasters in France